August Brunetti-Pisano (24 October 1870 - 1 September 1943), was an Austrian composer.

Brunetti-Pisano was born in St. Gilgen.  He was Georg Trakl's piano teacher. He was for a long time the president of the "Kunstgesellschaft Pan" (Society of Arts Pan) in Salzburg. In 1926 the "Brunetti-Gesellschaft" (Brunetti Society) was founded in Vienna.

As a Late Romantic he struggled all his life for recognition, but with little success. Since 2005 he has been rediscovered, especially in Salzburg, where he died.

Works
Präludium for the drama Die versunkene Glocke by Gerhart Hauptmann (1897)
Venezianische Symphonie (1904, won an award) 
Peter Schlemihl (opera based on the fairy tale Peter Schlemihls wundersame Geschichte by Adelbert von Chamisso, was presented on stage in 1908 at Ludwigsburg) 
Das klagende Lied (1908, opera based on the fairy tale Der singende Knochen from the Brothers Grimm's collection; not to be confused with the cantata Das klagende Lied by Gustav Mahler which is another adaptation based on the same fairy tale) 
Liebesopfer (opera) 
Djenaneh (opera) 
Österreichischer Bundesmarsch (Austrian Federal March)
Intermezzo for violin and organ (1926)
Dem Vaterland for male choir (1927, dedicated to the Austrian National Library)
Romanze for violin and piano (1928, Brunetti-Gesellschaft, Salzburg/Vienna)
Dithyrambe for choir (1928, text by Klopstock)
Symphony in D Major

Notes

1870 births
1943 deaths
Austrian classical composers
Austrian opera composers
Male opera composers
Austrian male classical composers